Lester Errol Brown MBE (12 November 1943 – 6 May 2015) was a British-Jamaican singer and songwriter, best known as the frontman of the soul and funk band Hot Chocolate. In 2004, Brown received the Ivor Novello Award for Outstanding Contribution to British Music.

Career
Brown was born in Kingston, Jamaica, but moved to the UK when he was twelve years old. His break in music came in 1969 when he recorded a version of John Lennon's "Give Peace a Chance" with a band called "Hot Chocolate Band". Unable to change the lyrics without Lennon's permission, he sent a copy to his record label, Apple, and the song was released with Lennon's approval.

The Hot Chocolate albums were produced by Mickie Most and recorded at the Rak Records studio. Brown left the group in 1985 to take a hiatus from music. He soon went on to have a solo career, achieving success in the clubs with the 1987 single "Body Rocking", produced by Richard James Burgess.

He was the subject of This Is Your Life in 1997 when he was surprised by Michael Aspel on his birthday.

Brown was a supporter of the Conservative Party and performed at a party conference in the 1980s. In 1981, he performed at the wedding reception of Prince Charles and Lady Diana Spencer, at Buckingham Palace.

Brown owned National Hunt horses, including Gainsay.

Recognition
In 2003, Queen Elizabeth II named Brown a Member of the Order of the British Empire for "services to popular music for the United Kingdom". In 2004 he received an Ivor Novello Award for outstanding contributions to British music.

Death
Brown died from liver cancer at his home in the Bahamas on 6 May 2015. He was survived by his wife Ginette and his two daughters, Colette and Leonie.

Discography

Albums
1989 That's How Love Is – WEA 243 925
1992 Secret Rendezvous – East West 4509-90688
1996 Love In This – East West 0630-15260
2001 Still Sexy — The Album – Universal Music TV 138162  (UK No.44)

Solo singles
1987 "Personal Touch" – WEA YZ 130  (UK No. 25)
1987 "Body Rocking" – WEA YZ 162 (UK No. 51)
1988 "Maya" – WEA YZ 313
1989 "Love Goes Up and Down" (UK No. 89)
1990 "Send a Prayer (To Heaven)" (UK No. 83)
1992 "This Time It's Forever" – East West 4509-90064  (Germany No. 26)
1992 "Secret Rendezvous" – East West 4509-90913
1993 "Emmalene (That's No Lie)" – East West 4509-92322
1996 "Ain't No Love in This" – East West 0630-13951
1996 "Change the People's Hearts" – East West 0630-16898
1998 "It Started with a Kiss"1 – EMI CDHOT 101  (UK No. 18)
2001 "Still Sexy (Yes U Are)" – Universal 158940 (UK No. 85)
2001 "Heaven's in the Back Seat of My Cadillac"
2002 "I Love You Everyday" – Universal 0157592
1Credited to Hot Chocolate featuring Errol Brown

See also
List of lead vocalists

References

External links
 Official website
 
 Errol Brown interview by Pete Lewis, Blues & Soul February 2009

1943 births
2015 deaths
Musicians from Kingston, Jamaica
Ivor Novello Award winners
Conservative Party (UK) people
Members of the Order of the British Empire
British songwriters
20th-century Black British male singers
English people of Jamaican descent
21st-century Black British male singers
British racehorse owners and breeders
Warner Records artists
EMI Records artists
British expatriates in the Bahamas
Deaths from liver cancer
Deaths from cancer in the Bahamas
Jamaican emigrants to the United Kingdom
Hot Chocolate (band) members